The University of Engineering and Technology, Faisalabad campus (UET Faisalabad campus) is a sub-campus of University of Engineering and Technology, Lahore located in Faisalabad, Punjab, Pakistan.

History and overview
In 2004, Government of Pakistan directed Government of the Punjab to set up a campus of University of Engineering and Technology, Lahore in Faisalabad with a future plan to upgrade it into a full-fledged university. In the same year, it was inaugurated by the then President of Pakistan Pervez Musharraf. Initially, the campus was started in the old Hamdard University Faisalabad campus until its own campus was built at the current location near Khurrianwala, Faisalabad. The campus covers 208 acres of land space.

Departments 
The campus has five departments.
 
 Department of Electrical, Electronics and Telecommunication Engineering
 Department of Mechanical, Mechatronics and Manufacturing Engineering
 Department of Chemical and Polymer Engineering
 Department of Basic Sciences and Humanities
 Department of Textile Engineering

Degree programs 
The campus offers following degree programs:

B.Sc Electrical Engineering
B.Sc Mechatronics and Control Engineering
B.Sc Chemical Engineering
B.Sc Textile Engineering
M.Sc Electrical Engineering
M.Sc Chemical Engineering
M.Sc Textile and Materials Engineering
M.Phil Applied Chemistry
BS Computer Science
BS Chemistry
BS Mathematics
BS Environmental Sciences
BBA

Student societies 
 Society of Electrical and Electronics Engineers (SEEE)
 Mechatronics And Control Society (MACS)
 Society of Chemical Engineers
 UET FSD Media and News Club
 Blood Donating Society
 Aquila Society

See also 
University of Engineering and Technology, New Campus
Rachna College of Engineering and Technology, Gujranwala

References

External links 
UET Faisalabad campus website
UET main campus website

University of Engineering and Technology, Lahore